Ilie Bărbulescu may refer to:

Ilie Bărbulescu (footballer)
Ilie Bărbulescu (linguist)